The 1982–83 season of the Moroccan Throne Cup was the 25th edition of the competition.

Olympique de Casablanca won the competition, beating Raja Club Athletic after a 1–1 draw on penalties (5–4) in the final, played at the stade Mohamed V in Casablanca.

Olympique de Casablanca won the competition for the first time in their history.

Tournament

Last 16

Quarter-finals

Semi-finals

Final 
The final took place between the two winning semi-finalists, Olympique de Casablanca and Raja Club Athletic, on 21 August 1983 at the Stade Mohamed V in Casablanca.

Notes and references 

1982
1982 in association football
1983 in association football
1982–83 in Moroccan football